Argy is a commune in the department of Indre and the region of Centre-Val de Loire, France.

Population

See also
Communes of the Indre department

References

Communes of Indre